The men's artistic team all-around competition at the 1952 Summer Olympics was held at the Messuhalli, Exhibition Hall I on 19 and 21 July. It was the tenth appearance of the event.

Competition format
The gymnastics format continued to use the aggregation format, though the team scoring was tweaked from previous years. Each nation entered a team of between five and eight gymnasts. All entrants in the gymnastics competitions performed both a compulsory exercise and a voluntary exercise for each apparatus. The top five individual scores in each exercise (that is, compulsory floor, voluntary floor, compulsory vault, etc.) were added to give a team score for that exercise. The 12 team exercise scores were summed to give a team total.

No separate finals were contested.

For each exercise, four judges gave scores from 0 to 10 in one-tenth point increments. The top and bottom scores were discarded and the remaining two scores averaged to give the exercise total. Thus, exercise scores ranged from 0 to 10, apparatus scores from 0 to 20, individual totals from 0 to 120, and team scores from 0 to 600. 

For the vault, each competitor had two tries for each of the compulsory and voluntary vaults with the better score to count. For the other four (non-floor) apparatus exercises, the competitor had the option to make a second try only on the compulsory exercise—with the second attempt counting regardless of whether it was better than the first. For both compulsory and voluntary floor exercises, and voluntary exercises in the non-floor, non-vault apparatuses, only one attempt could be made.

Results

References

Men's artistic team all-around
1952
Men's events at the 1952 Summer Olympics